Tinieblas JR (born May 26, 1966), better known by his ring name Tinieblas Jr., is a Mexican Luchador enmascarado (or masked professional wrestler). He is the son of Manuel Leal, who wrestled for many years as Tinieblas. "Tinieblas" is Spanish for "Darkness".

Professional wrestling career
Tinieblas Jr. made his professional wrestling debut in 1990, wearing a mask closely resembling that of his father Tinieblas.

Lucha Libre USA (2010–2011)
During the summer of 2010, Tinieblas Jr. began working for a newly created wrestling promotion, backed by MTV2 called Lucha Libre USA, wrestling on their first television taping on June 19, 2010. On January 22, 2011, Tinieblas Jr. and El Oriental became the first ever LLUSA Tag Team Champions by defeating the Puerto Rican Power (PR Flyer and San Juan Kid) and Treachery (Rellik and Sydistiko) in a three-way tag team match. He later turned on El Oriental, winning the tag team title with Sol, although the controversial circumstances surrounding the title change led to the title being vacated. His last match for LLUSA saw Tinieblas Jr. team up with Lizmark Jr., losing to El Oriental and  Águila.

Championships and accomplishments
American Combat Wrestling
Copa Guerrera de Leyendas (1 time, current)
International Wrestling Revolution Group 
IWRG Intercontinental Heavyweight Championship (2 times)
Lucha Libre USA
LLUSA Tag Team Championship (2 times) – with El Oriental (1) and Sol (1)
World Wrestling Organization
WWO Heavyweight Championship (3 times)

Luchas de Apuestas record

Notes

Further reading

References

External links
Lucha Libre USA profile
CageMatch profile 

1966 births
Living people
Masked wrestlers
Mexican male professional wrestlers
Professional wrestlers from Mexico City